Sir William Gurney Benham, FSA, FRHS (16 February 1859 – 13 May 1944) was a British newspaper editor, published author and three times Mayor of Colchester.

Early life and family
William Benham was born on 16 February 1859 to Edward Benham, a printer, and Mary Carr. He was educated at the Merchant Taylors' School until 1873 and then at Colchester Royal Grammar School, a school about which he has written, of whose old boys' society he was later President and which still has a building named after him. In 1904 he married Ethel Hervey Elwes and had three children: Edith Tayspill Benham (1905-1955), Hervey William Gurney Benham (1910-1987) and Maura Elwes Mary Benham (1912-1995).

Career
His first job was as a journalist in Wiltshire in 1881. In 1884 he took over the family printing business and began his 59-year editorship of the Essex County Standard. From 1892 to 1929 he edited the newspaper jointly with his brother, Charles Edwin Benham. A "conscientious as well as an excellent scholar", he is now mainly known through his many publications, many of which are transcriptions of official documents from mediaeval times, particularly those related to his home town of Colchester. He also compiled a number of books of quotations, leading a reviewer in the Journal of Education to comment after his death, "it is remarkable that one man — Sir William Gurney Benham — was able to collect and arrange some fifty thousand quotations and proverbs". For ten years he was also editor of the Essex Review.

In addition, Gurney Benham was mayor of Colchester three times, for the years 1892/93, 1908/09 and 1933/34, in 1933 was appointed to the honour of High Steward of Colchester and was knighted in 1935 in recognition of his public service. He remained editor of the Standard until 1943, and was a director of the Colchester Gas Company for over forty years, being chairman until his resignation on grounds of ill health the day before his death.

Death and legacy
Benham died on 13 May 1944.

Gurney Benham Close, a street in Colchester, and Gurney Benham House, a building on the Colchester Royal Grammar School campus, are named after him.

Publications 
 Playing Cards: The History and Secrets of the Pack
 Book of Quotations, Proverbs and Household Words (1924, reprinted 1929)
 
 
 A Short History of Playing Cards
 The Benham Book of Palmistry 1988
 Benham's New Book of Quotations.  1988
 The oath book; or, Red parchment book of Colchester

References

External links 
 The oath book; or, Red parchment book of Colchester on Archive.org (1907).

1859 births
1944 deaths
English newspaper editors
English male journalists
English lexicographers
Mayors of Colchester
People educated at Colchester Royal Grammar School
Fellows of the Royal Historical Society
English justices of the peace